Kristian Niemann (born 26 October 1971) is a Swedish guitarist who has performed for bands such as Therion, Lithium, and Demonoid. He is the brother of Johan Niemann.

References

External links

Therion (band) members
Swedish heavy metal guitarists
Living people
1971 births
Demonoid (band) members